Ó Creachmhaoil is an Irish surname, often anglicised as Craughwell, Croughwell, Crockwell, and Crowell.

Etymology

Ó, in Irish surnames, indicates a grandson or descendant of the person whose given name it precedes (as in Ó Briain: grandson of Brian). Creachmhaoil is not used as a given name in Ireland, and is actually a toponym, composed of two Gaelic words.

Creach, which is related to craig, and creag, and the English word crag, refers to a rock (with which word it rhymes), or the bare rock crest of a hill (related words are cruach, for a mountain, pinnacle, or a rounded hill that stands apart...or for any type of pile, or heap, and 'cnoc', for a hill or eminence). An alternate etymology of creach is plunder, presumably in reference to herds of cattle, which were often targets of thefts and cattle raids amongst the Gaels. The usual Gaelic word for cattle is crodh, often Anglicised in place-names as crow, although the words cro, crocharsach, and crò are all connected with sheep, sheep enclosures or meadows.

A maol is a round-shaped hill or mountain, bare of trees. It is anglicised as mull, and is common in Irish and Scottish place names such as the Mull of Kintyre. Gaelic spelling rules require that maol, following creach, be lenited; that is, an h is inserted after the first letter, providing the first letter is a consonant (and not an l, n, or r). This h makes the preceding consonant silent, or changes its sound (mh, or bh, for instance, are silent or sound like an English v or w). Gaelic spelling rules also require that, with the first letter lenited, the last vowel should be slender (an i, or an e). As both vowels in maol are broad (a, o, u), an i is inserted after. These two changes alter the sound of maol (rhymes with mull) to mhaoil (rhymes with uell, or well). The sound of the two word together, therefore, sounds to an English ear like Crockwell, or Craughwell, and it is Anglicised thus (the Gaelic personal names Seán (John) and Seamus (James) became Iain and Hamish in Scotland by similar means).

The complete toponym is used, today, to connote the village in Galway, but presumably was adopted from a nearby hill. The village is too small to have been known far afield, and the surname is largely restricted in Ireland to County Galway. Ó Creachmhaoil, therefore, is presumably a Toponymic surname adopted by villagers from Creachmhaoil upon their moving to other parts of Galway.

History

It was largely unknown outside of the south-east of County Galway, where the village of Creachmhaoil is also found, until the latter end of the 19th century when emigres established branches of the family which still thrive in Cornwall and Devonshire (where it is frequently mistaken for a variant of the surname Crocker), Liverpool, and London, in England, Newfoundland, Bermuda, Ohio and Berkshire County, Massachusetts, among other places. The surname (rendered Cragwell, Crockwell, Crogwell, Crachuell, Crackwell, Crackwill, Crockwill, Crockwile, Crachwell, and Crickwell) evidently arrived in Barbados in the 17th century (probably as part of the involuntary Irish immigration to Barbados that followed the Cromwellian invasion of Ireland), (the Crockwells of Bermuda descend from a single Barbadian who settled there in the 19th century, that spelling now appearing to be extinct in Barbados, possibly as a result of re-emigration). Documentation on the origin of the surname is not recorded, but it is doubtless connected to the village.

People

Notable bearers of the name include American painter Douglass Crockwell, Irish Senator Gerard Craughwell of the Seanad Éireann, Bermudian parliamentarian Shawn Crockwell, JP, MP, FIFA-certified Bermudian football referee, Carlyle McNeil Eugene Crockwell, Bermudian footballers Denzel Crockwell (of Ireland Rangers FC), and Mikkail Crockwell (of Dandy Town FC and Bermuda Hogges FC), Bermudian cricketer Fiqre Crockwell, English cricketer Leslie Crockwell, Guinness World Record holding rower Matthew Craughwell, Newfoundland photographer Chris Crockwell, Newfoundland-born author Marion Anderson (born Marion Crockwell), American author Thomas J. Craughwell, film director and actor Charles Croughwell, actress Callie Marie Croughwell, and her actor brothers, Joshua Croughwell and Cameron Croughwell, sword-maker Michael "Irish Mike" Craughwell (star of the Discovery Channel television series Big Giant Swords), and educator and Los Angeles Times film critic Kathleen Craughwell,.

References

External links
 Douglass Crockwell
 1900 Massachusetts Census, Berkshire County, City of Adams

Surnames
Surnames of Irish origin
Irish families
Irish-language surnames